The following is a list of the television networks and announcers who have broadcast the college football's Army–Navy Game throughout the years.

2020s

2010s

2000s

1990s

1980s

1970s

1960s

Notes
The first instant replay occurred December 7, 1963 during the Army–Navy Game played in Philadelphia and telecast by CBS-TV. The program was directed by  CBS Sports' top director, Tony Verna. Verna's account of how he was able to combine the limited abilities of the videotape machines can be found in two of his early books, Live TV and Global Television (both Focal Press) and a 2008 book Instant Replay, The Day That Changed Sports Forever (from Creative Publishers International). A personal account of the telecast can be found in the autobiography of the game announcer Lindsey Nelson (Hello Everybody, I'm Lindsey Nelson).

1950s

1940s

References

External links
Army/Navy announcers and networks Army/Navy announcers and networks
Overnight ratings for Army/Navy since' 99

Broadcasters
CBS Sports
ABC Sports
Football on NBC
Lists of college football broadcasters